Datuk Robert Lawson Chuat anak Vincent Entering (born 14 June 1958) is a Malaysian politician who served as the Member of Parliament (MP) for Betong from May 2018 to November 2022 and Chairman of the Bintulu Port Authority (BPA) since April 2020. He served as Member of the Sarawak State Legislative Assembly (MLA) for Bukit Saban from May 2006 to May 2016. He is a member of the Parti Pesaka Bumiputera Bersatu (PBB), a component party of the ruling Gabungan Parti Sarawak (GPS) coalition and formerly ruling Barisan Nasional (BN) coalition.

Political career
Robert was first elected as a Member of the Sarawak State Legislative Assembly (MLA) in 2006 after contesting for and winning in the 9th Sarawak state elections for Bukit Saban constituency. In 2011, he successfully defended the same seat in the following 10th Sarawak state elections with an increased majority. Following his win, he was appointed as Sarawak's Assistant Minister of Welfare, Women and Family Development.

After serving two terms as MLA for Bukit Saban, he yielded his seat to allow Deputy Chief Minister I of Sarawak, Douglas Uggah Embas to contest instead. Consequently, Robert was fielded as PBB's candidate to contest for Douglas' parliamentary seat of Betong in the 14th Malaysian general election.

Education
Robert completed his early education in his hometown of Betong, Sarawak and holds a Diploma in Business Studies from the Brighton Polytechnic, United Kingdom.

Personal life
Robert is a nephew to former Deputy Chief Minister II of Sarawak Alfred Jabu Numpang and married to Claudia Regina Janting.

Robert is a director of 'Durafarm' and among the major shareholders of a 'KACC Construction Sdn. Bhd.', alongside Bustari Yusof, the brother of former Minister of Works of Malaysia, Fadillah Yusof, a company which has been repeatedly being accused of allegedly siphoning public funds and receiving an unusually large amount of multimillion government projects.

Election results

Honours
  :
  Officer of the Order of the Defender of the Realm (KMN) (2008)
  :
  Commander of the Order of the Star of Hornbill Sarawak (PGBK) – Datuk (2018)

See also
 Betong (federal constituency)
 Bukit Saban (state constituency)

References

Living people
Sarawak politicians
Iban people
Officers of the Order of the Defender of the Realm
Commanders of the Order of the Star of Hornbill Sarawak
People from Sarawak
Members of the Dewan Rakyat
21st-century Malaysian politicians
Members of the Sarawak State Legislative Assembly
Alumni of the University of Brighton
1958 births